Kim Sunna (born June 14, 1987) is a Swedish professional ice hockey player. He currently plays for Luleå HF of the Swedish Elitserien.

References

External links

1987 births
Living people
Luleå HF players
Swedish ice hockey left wingers